Christophe Galtier (born 23 August 1966) is a French professional football coach and former player who is the head coach of Ligue 1 club Paris Saint-Germain.

A defender, Galtier was a journeyman professional who spent many of his 15 years as a player at Marseille with spells at six other clubs, four in France and one each in Italy and China.

With Saint-Étienne, Galtier won the Manager of the Year award at the Trophées UNFP du football in 2013, which he shared with Carlo Ancelotti, and again in 2019 after Lille finished in second place during the 2018–19 Ligue 1 season. He won the trophy for a third time in 2021 after guiding Lille to their fourth Ligue 1 title in club history. After a one-year spell at Nice, Galtier joined Paris Saint-Germain in 2022.

Early life and playing career
Christophe Galtier was born on 23 August 1966 in Marseille, Bouches-du-Rhône. He spent a large part of his playing career in France with his hometown club Marseille, whom he represented in two different spells. In a fifteen-year career, he also played for Lille, Toulouse, Angers, and Nîmes in France, before ending his career with stints in Italy for Monza and with Liaoning in China.

Coaching career

Assistant coach (1999–2009)
From 1999 to 2004, Galtier was assistant coach at Marseille, Aris and Bastia. From 2004 to 2009, he worked as Alain Perrin's assistant coach at Al Ain, Portsmouth, Sochaux, Lyon and Saint-Étienne (ASSE).

Saint-Étienne

In December 2009, Galtier was appointed the head coach of Saint-Étienne, with ASSE in danger of relegation following the departure of Alain Perrin. In his first season, Galtier successfully guided ASSE to safety, finishing in 17th place. ASSE finished in the top 10 of Ligue 1 in the seven consecutive seasons of Galtier's tenure, with 4 of those seasons ending in a European place. 

In 2013, ASSE defeated Rennes to win the Coupe de la Ligue, their first trophy in 32 years. His European debut as a head coach is a 3–0 home win over Moldovan club Milsami Orhei in the 2013–14 UEFA Europa League qualifying phase on 1 August 2013.

On 9 May 2017, Galtier announced he would be leaving Saint-Étienne at the end of the season upon the expiration of his contract. At that moment he was the longest serving Ligue 1 manager still active, having taken the reins for eight years. On 20 May 2017, he left the club after 361 games, including 147 wins, as Saint-Étienne head coach.

Lille

On 22 December 2017, Galtier became the new manager of Lille, who were at the 18th place in the league. However, they eventually avoided relegation places by one point in the 2017–18 season. In the 2018–19 season, he led Lille to finish second and qualify for the next Champions League season, after a seven-year absence.

During the 2020–21 season, Galtier guided Lille to their first Ligue 1 title in 10 years and the fourth in club history. Galtier was praised by many pundits over the course of the season for both his tactics and his ability to develop young talent including Jonathan David, Renato Sanches, and Mike Maignan. For his efforts, Galtier was named the Ligue 1 Manager of the Year for a third time. On 25 May 2021, two days after winning the league title, he resigned as manager. He stated: "I simply have the deep belief that my time is up here."

Nice
On 28 June 2021, Galtier was appointed as the new head coach of fellow Ligue 1 club Nice. In his first season, he led the team to a fifth-place finish and a Coupe de France final, where they lost 1–0 to Nantes. Nice qualified for the UEFA Europa Conference League play-off round as a result. He left Nice on 27 June 2022, being replaced by Lucien Favre.

Paris Saint-Germain 
On 5 July 2022, Galtier agreed a two-year deal to become the manager of Ligue 1 champions Paris Saint-Germain, replacing Mauricio Pochettino. In his first transfer window, he oversaw the arrivals of Hugo Ekitike, Nordi Mukiele, Fabián Ruiz, Renato Sanches, Carlos Soler, and Vitinha.

Managerial statistics

Honours

Player
Marseille
Coupe de France runner-up: 1986–87

Manager
Saint-Étienne
Coupe de la Ligue: 2012–13

Lille
Ligue 1: 2020–21

Nice
Coupe de France runner-up: 2021–22

Paris Saint-Germain
 Trophée des Champions: 2022

Individual
Ligue 1 Manager of the Year: 2012–13 (joint), 2018–19, 2020–21

References

External links

 Playing career
 

1966 births
Living people
Footballers from Marseille
French footballers
Association football defenders
Olympique de Marseille players
Lille OSC players
Toulouse FC players
Angers SCO players
Nîmes Olympique players
A.C. Monza players
Liaoning F.C. players
Ligue 1 players
Serie B players
French expatriate footballers
Expatriate footballers in China
Expatriate footballers in Italy
French expatriate sportspeople in China
French expatriate sportspeople in Italy
French football managers
SC Bastia managers
AS Saint-Étienne managers
Lille OSC managers
OGC Nice managers
Paris Saint-Germain F.C. managers
Ligue 1 managers
Association football coaches
Olympique de Marseille non-playing staff
Aris Thessaloniki F.C. non-playing staff
France under-21 international footballers